Ilya A. Strebulaev is a Russian-American financial economist. He is the David S. Lobel Professor of Private Equity and Professor of Finance at the Stanford University Graduate School of Business, where he has been on the faculty since 2004. He is also a research associate at the National Bureau of Economic Research.

Strebulaev's research has focused on dynamic corporate finance. Recently, he has been working on issues related to venture capital and financing innovation. In his research on valuation of unicorns (highly valued venture capital backed companies), Strebulaev finds that unicorns are overvalued by more than 50%.

In 2007 Strebulaev won the Brattle Award first paper prize (Journal of Finance) for his paper "Do Capital Structure Tests Mean What They Say?". In 2011 he won the Fama-DFA best paper prize (Journal of Financial Economics) for his paper "Corporate Bond Default Risk: A 150-Year Perspective."

Strebulaev earned his Ph.D. in Finance at the London Business School in 2004.

References

External links
 Stanford University Faculty website
 SSRN Author Page
 Google scholar page

Living people
Moscow State University alumni
New Economic School alumni
Alumni of London Business School
Stanford University Graduate School of Business faculty
Year of birth missing (living people)
American people of Russian descent